The superfamily Hagloidea are insects belonging to the order Orthoptera: Ensifera; they are now represented by the extant Prophalangopsidae, with many extinct genera and families (see below).

Families
 †Eospilopteronidae 
 †Haglidae 
 †Hagloedischiidae 
 †Prezottophlebiidae 
 Prophalangopsidae 
 †Tuphellidae 
 incertae sedis
 †''Tzetzenulia

References

External links
 
 

Insect superfamilies
Ensifera